Aalesund University College (Norwegian: Høgskolen i Ålesund) was a medium-sized institution of higher education in Norway with 2249 students and 224 employees.

AAUC was founded in 1994 as a result of the reorganisation of professional higher education in Norway. Three former colleges in Ålesund, the College of Marine Studies, the College of Engineering and Aalesund College of Nursing were then merged into one institution.

The college was divided into five faculties:
 Faculty of Health Sciences
 Faculty of International Marketing
 Faculty of Life Sciences
 Faculty of Engineering and Natural Sciences
 Faculty of Maritime Technology and Operations

AAUC was merged with NTNU, Sør-Trøndelag University College and Gjøvik University College under the name NTNU in Aalesund in January 2016.

References

External links 
 Official web site

Universities and colleges in Norway
Education in Møre og Romsdal
Educational institutions established in 1994
1994 establishments in Norway
Organisations based in Ålesund